Château Grimaldi is the name given to several Châteaux in Europe which were founded by various members of the Grimaldi Family.

These Châteaux include:

Château Grimaldi (Cagnes), at Cagnes-sur-Mer in the département of Alpes-Maritimes, in France, is built on the site of an earlier fortress occupied by the Greeks and then the Romans
Château Grimaldi (Antibes) (also known as the Picasso Museum), at Antibes is built upon the foundations of the ancient Greek town of Antipolis. Antibes is a resort town in the Alpes-Maritimes department in southeastern France, on the Mediterranean Sea
Château Grimaldi (Puyricard), at Puyricard near Aix-en-Provence is a mansion built within the ruined walls of a 16th-century Château once belonging to the Archbishops of Puyricard
The Prince's Palace of Monaco, sometimes referred to as Château Grimaldi in the Middle Ages